Jhang , (Gurmukhi: ਝੰਗ) is a subdivision (Tehsil) of Jhang District in the Punjab province of Pakistan. It is subdivided into 55 Union Councils. 

The city of Jhang is the headquarters of the tehsil.

References

Jhang District
Tehsils of Punjab, Pakistan
Populated places in Jhang District